Gastromyzon punctulatus, the hillstream loach, is a species of ray-finned fish in the genus Gastromyzon.

Footnotes 
 

Gastromyzon
Taxa named by Robert F. Inger
Fish described in 1961